Hohensaaten is a village and a former municipality in Brandenburg in Germany. Since 1 January 2009, it is part of the municipality Bad Freienwalde.

History 
Hohensaaten was first mentioned in 1258. The village belonged to Barnim district. After a year-long dispute between municipal board and citizens, partly because of averse to the Barnim district, the treaty of mergence with city of Bad Freienwalde was signed on 14 November 2008. Since 1 January 2009, it is part of the municipality Bad Freienwalde, hence part of Märkisch-Oderland district.

References 

Villages in Brandenburg
Localities in Märkisch-Oderland
Former municipalities in Brandenburg